The National Justice Project (NJP) is a not for profit legal service established to promote human rights, social justice and to fight against disadvantage and discrimination in Australia through strategic legal action, effective advocacy and communication.

The Project includes academics, legal practitioners and advocates from a wide range of disciplines to identify, assess and conduct test-case litigation. In order to do so it generates research and has developed expertise in identifying test-cases with the potential to contribute to long-term and strategic change to the Australian legal system and countries in the region with the aim of advancing social justice and human rights in Australia.

George Newhouse, is the Principal Solicitor of the NJP and an adjunct professor at Macquarie University Law School.

Social Justice Clinic
The project operates a social justice clinic  located within the Macquarie University in NSW.

The clinic provides practical legal experience and training for law students as part of the NJP's social change objectives.

The Social Justice Clinic’s innovative model offers students practical legal experience under the supervision of experienced human rights and public interest lawyers.

Following a United States-style clinical education model, the University appoints lawyers from partner organisations as academic staff, and focuses on students’ education rather than on caseload and clients.

Students work on real-world social justice cases, and on a range of activities including legal research and writing, client interviewing and activism. Placements are run on campus at Macquarie Law School in partnership with leading Australian public interest legal practices. The program prepares students for work in the social justice advocacy area.

Advocacy

Aboriginal Health Matters
The Aboriginal Health Matters Project (the AHM) is the first of its kind in Australia. The AHM project is dedicated to using the law to highlight cases of medical mistreatment of Aboriginal Australians based on systemic policy failures and unconscious bias or racial profiling.

The AHM initiative is focused on the legal response to the problem by strategically selecting cases are aimed to:

 raise awareness about the poor treatment and outcomes for Aboriginal/Indigenous Australians on their journey through the health system – particularly focused on emergency or hospital interactions; and
 seek reform in Medical Practice and independent review of the treatment of Aboriginal/Indigenous Australians in the health system nationally.

The AHM focuses on achieving real outcomes for Aboriginal Australians by working with Aboriginal doctors, Aboriginal legal and Health services and Jumbunna Indigenous House of Learning Research Unit, wh to build close associations with Aboriginal communities and generate research to steer strategic case selection. The AHM Project builds on existing research and relationships with Aboriginal and Community Legal Centres to support the legal work of the Project.

Pacific Justice Project
There is a desperate lack of access to justice in South East Asia and the Pacific.

In order to address this problem the National Justice Project has galvanised Australian social justice lawyers to provide legal administrative and other support to Lawyers in Papua New Guinea, Irian Jaya, Nauru, East Timor and the Pacific Islands.

The Aboriginal Innocence Project
The Aboriginal Innocence Project is the first Innocence Project in Australia specifically dedicated to the wrongful conviction and incarceration of Aboriginal Australians. The AIP will be a vital part of the Australian social justice landscape.

In each case, the AIP aims to:

1. Correct errors (or facilitate exoneration in the event of wrongful conviction); and

2. Prevent errors (or generate research that facilitates law reform).

The AIP's strategy is to obtain a just outcome for the individual and also to influence change to ensure the injustice is not repeated. This will be achieved through research and strategic case selection by senior solicitors. The selected cases will then be reviewed, and briefs will be prepared for barristers who will act on a pro-bono basis. 
The Project is unique because it will commence with the strategic selection of cases relating to the wrongful conviction of Aboriginal Australians after being tried or interviewed without an interpreter or with an unqualified and/or co-accused interpreter. This will not only include cases where an appellant is non-English speaking but also when an appellant speaks “Aboriginal-English” and/or demonstrates gratuitous concurrence

Coronial Inquests, Refugee and Asylum seekers 
The National Justice Project is acting in relation to a number of deaths of asylum seekers and refugees in detention. The National Justice Project is also acting for the family of young Aboriginal men and women who have died in detention or in the health system.

Management and governance
The National Justice Project is governed by a board of directors that includes:
 David Radcliff Chairperson
 Jo Scard 
 Elizabeth O'Shea
 Adjunct Professor George Newhouse 
 Stephen Castan
 Dan Michael Mori 
 Duncan Fine

The current Principal Solicitor is George Newhouse.

Cases
 National Justice Project calls for Inquest into the deaths of two Aboriginal Girls
 National Justice Project launches two class actions for asylum seekers on Nauru and Manus
 National Justice Project calls for kids to be removed from Nauru
 Begging to Die, Kids Moved Off Nauru
 Australia agrees to take seriously ill refugee girl from Nauru as case reaches court
 Mental Health of Children in Nauru Detention is at Crisis Point
 National Justice Project is taking action to eliminate systemic prejudice in health care
 National Justice Project launches Copwatch
 The National Justice Project - Community Journalism and Police Accountability
 NJP Speaks out about sexual violence on Nauru
 Ms Dhu's death should not be in vain 
 NJP Fights for medical care for a boy on Nauru 
 NJP Searches for Answers regarding Indigenous Health failures
 Federal Court Orders Halt to Border Force Phone Confiscation Plans
 NJP Fights to End the Death Penalty

References

External links
 National Justice Project webpage
 Social Justice Clinic webpage

Macquarie University
Human rights organisations based in Australia
Legal research institutes
Legal organisations based in Australia